The 2022 Mercer Bears football team represented Mercer University as a member of the Southern Conference (SoCon)  during the 2022 NCAA Division I FCS football season. The Bears were led by third-year head coach Drew Cronic and played their home games at Moye Complex in Macon, Georgia.

Previous season

The Bears finished the 2021 season with a record of 7–3, 6–2 SoCon play to finish in second place.

Roster

Schedule

Game summaries

Morehead State

at Auburn

The Citadel

at Gardner–Webb

at Wofford

Western Carolina

East Tennessee State

at No. 10 Chattanooga

at VMI

No. 13 Furman

at No. 9 Samford

References

Mercer
Mercer Bears football seasons
Mercer Bears football